Estadio Olimpico de San Marcos is a multi-use stadium in San Marcos, Nicaragua.  It is currently used mostly for football matches and is the home stadium to FC San Marcos.  The stadium holds 3,000 people.

Football venues in Nicaragua
Carazo Department